Jhumroo is a 1961 Indian Hindi-language romantic comedy film directed by Shankar Mukherjee. It stars Madhubala and Kishore Kumar in lead roles, with Chanchal, Anoop Kumar, Lalita Pawar and Jayant appearing in supporting roles. The screenplay is written by Madhusudan Kalekar, dialogue by Vrajendra Gaud and story by Kishore Kumar. Jhumroo was theatrically released on 27 January, 1961 and became a box office success. It is among the final films to star Madhubala.

Plot 

Anjana, a wealthy girl returns to her home after completing her education. Here she meets Jhumroo, a local tribal and falls in love with him. Her father strongly disapproves of the match. It turns out that Jhumroo's foster mother is the real mother of Anjana. Her father's best friend, whom her father had duped, is the real father of Jhumroo.
Watch the movie to find out how it all ends.

Cast 
 Madhubala as Anjana
 Kishore Kumar as Jhumroo
 Lalita Pawar as Kamli/Kamla
 Jayant as Dwarka Nath
 Chanchal as Chamki
 Anoop Kumar as Ramesh
 Sajjan as Banno
 M. Kumar as Bihari

Soundtrack 
The soundtrack was composed by Kishore Kumar. The music was arranged by S.D. Burman's musical band.

The song "Koi Humdum Na Raha" was a cover of the song of the same name, composed by Saraswati Devi, and sung by the actor – and occasional singer – Ashok Kumar for Jeevan Naiya (1936). Kishore Kumar had heard Ashok Kumar sing "Koi Humdum Na Raha" as a five years old, and developed an affinity for it, so much so that he would practice riyaz singing it during his boyhood days. Two and a half decades later, while composing the music for Jhumroo, Kishore proposed to render the song for his film, and approached his brother for it. But as it happens, when his brother tried to dissuade him from doing so, saying that it was an intricate metre to compose, Kishore light-heartedly observed, "I don’t know about that but I will sing it and I will sing it better than you." And with that exchange of banter, he proceeded to render the song. "Koi Humdum Na Raha" is often regarded by music connoisseurs as one of Kumar's best songs.

Lyrics of all songs written by Majrooh Sultanpuri, except 2 songs Main hoon jhumroo & Ruk tuk thum thum – both written by Kishore Kumar.

Reception 
In Filmigeek review, it was written that "Jhumroo follows a set of conventions that are relatively ordinary for filmi romantic comedy." It praised the soundtrack of the film saying, "The songs keep coming fast and thick, and they are all well-crafted both musically and visually." Writing about Madhubala's performance, it stated that she is "genius at a gentle physical comedy that both gets out of Kishore's way to let him own the screen."

Box office 
Jhumroo was released on January 27, 1961 and earned 11 million at the box office, generating a huge profit of 5.5 million for the producers. Consequently the film was a commercial success and emerged as the eleventh highest-grossing film of 1961.

References

External links 
 

1960s Hindi-language films
1961 films
1961 romantic comedy films
Indian romantic comedy films